Time Odyssey is the second studio album by guitarist Vinnie Moore, released in 1988 through PolyGram. As of 2013 it is Moore's only release to enter the Billboard 200 chart, where it peaked at #147.

Track listing

Personnel
Vinnie Moore – guitar, production
Jordan Rudess – keyboard
Joe Franco – drums
Michael Bean – bass
Joe Alexander – engineering
Brooke Hendricks – engineering
Bob Ludwig – mastering

Chart performance

References

External links
In Review: Vinnie Moore "Time Odyssey" at Guitar Nine Records

Vinnie Moore albums
1988 albums
PolyGram albums